Fegentri stands for  International Federation of Gentlemen and Lady Riders or, in French, Fédération Internationale des Gentlemen-Riders et des Cavalières. It was founded in 1955 . The founding members were France, Germany, Italy, Sweden and Switzerland. Many nations have joined Fegentri since 1955 and today the membership consists of 25 different countries.

Notable members
 Nathalie Bélinguier (Présidente)
 Thierry Lohest (Vice-Président)

References

Horse racing organizations